William Pitt most commonly refers to:
 William Pitt, 1st Earl of Chatham (1708–1778),  William Pitt the Elder, British prime minister (1766–1768)
 William Pitt the Younger (1759–1806), son of the above and British prime minister (1783–1801, 1804–1806)

William Pitt may also refer to:
 William Pitt (courtier) (1559–1636), English courtier and politician who sat in the House of Commons (1614–1625)
 William Augustus Pitt (c. 1728–1809), British general
 William Pitt Amherst, 1st Earl Amherst (1773–1857), Governor-General of India between 1823 and 1828
 William Pitt Kalanimoku (1768–1827), chief minister to King Kamehameha I
 William Pitt Leleiohoku I (1821–1848), son of Kalanimoku
 John William Pitt Kinau (1842–1859), prince of Hawaii and son of Leleiohoku I
 William Pitt Leleiohoku II (1854–1877), Crown Prince of Hawaii
 William Baker Pitt (1856–1936), founder of Swindon Town F.C. and Catholic prebendary
 William Fox-Pitt (born 1969), English equestrian
 William Morton Pitt (1764–1836), British politician and MP for Poole (1780–1790) and Dorset (1790–1826)
 William Rivers Pitt (born 1971), left-wing American essayist
 William Pitt (architect) (1855–1918), Australian 19th-century architect
 William Pitt (engineer) (1840–1909), Canadian inventor of the underwater cable ferry in the early 1900s
 William Pitt (Mormon) (1813–1873), early Mormon bandleader
 William Pitt (ship-builder) (died 1840), author of The Sailor's Consolation
 William Pitt (cricketer) (1800–1871), English cricketer
 William Pitt Murray (1825–1910), American lawyer and politician
 Bill Pitt (politician) (1937–2017), British politician and MP for Croydon North West (1981–1983)
 Bill Pitt (racing driver) (born 1926), Australian racing driver and motor racing official
 Brad Pitt (William Bradley Pitt, born 1963), American actor
 William Pitt (singer), American singer
 , a list of ships with the name
, a three-decker sailing ship
, an East Indiaman

See also 
 
 Pitt (disambiguation)
 Pitt family
 Pitt ministry (disambiguation)
 Premiership of William Pitt (disambiguation)